Swallownest is a village in the civil parish of Aston cum Aughton and the Metropolitan Borough of Rotherham, South Yorkshire, England.

Swallownest borders the Sheffield suburb of Woodhouse to the west, Beighton to the southwest, the small village of Aston to the east, and Aughton to the north. The village is also served by Woodhouse railway station.

According to White's directory of 1833, Swallow Nest was the name of the Toll bar and public house, the home of J. Ward, a victualler and H. Ward, a wheelwright.

See also
Swallownest railway station
Swallownest Miners Welfare F.C.
Listed buildings in Aston cum Aughton

References

Villages in South Yorkshire